Kapoxó (Capoxo, Kaposho) is an extinct Maxakalian language of Brazil.

Documentation
Kapoxó is documented in a word list collected in 1818, which was published in Martius, 1863: 170-172.

Distribution
Kapoxó was historically spoken on the Araçuaí River in Minas Gerais, Brazil. Kumanaxó and Panhame are closely related varieties.

Further reading
Métraux, Alfred and Curt Nimuendajú. 1946. The Mashacalí, Patashó, and Malalí Linguistic Families. In Julian H. Steward (ed.), The Marginal Tribes, 541-545. Smithsonian Institution, Washington: Bureau of American Ethnology.

References

Maxakalían languages
Extinct languages of South America
Languages of Brazil